Ban Hyo-jung (born Ban Man-hee on November 27, 1942) is a South Korean actress. She made her acting debut in 1964 with a bit part in Shin Sang-ok's film Rice, and went on to a prolific career in television dramas.

Filmography

Film

Television series

Awards and nominations

References

External links
 
 
 
 

1942 births
Living people
South Korean television actresses
South Korean film actresses
20th-century South Korean actresses
21st-century South Korean actresses
People from Daegu
Geoje Ban clan